The 1917 Saskatchewan general election was held on June 26, 1917, to elect members of the Legislative Assembly of Saskatchewan.

After replacing Walter Scott as leader of the Liberal Party of Saskatchewan and premier of the province, William M. Martin led the party to its fourth consecutive victory, winning all but 8 of the 59 seats in the legislature.

The Conservative Party of Wellington Willoughby continued to lose popular support.

This was the first Saskatchewan election in which women were allowed to vote and run for office. However, none were declared elected in this vote; the first Saskatchewan woman elected an MLA was after a 1918 by-election.

The Non-Partisan League, forerunner of the Progressive Party of Saskatchewan, nominated candidates for the first time, although none were successful. Labour candidates also appeared for the first time.

David John Sykes became the first Independent to sit in the Saskatchewan legislature. He was nominated by the Liberal, Conservative and Non-Partisan League organizations, and thus was acclaimed this election.

An at-large service vote was held to elect three soldiers from October 3 to October 13, 1917. All service members were not affiliated, and were elected to represent Saskatchewan residents stationed in France, Belgium and Great Britain.

Results

Note:* Party did not nominate candidates in previous election.

Percentages

Members of the Legislative Assembly elected
For complete electoral history, see individual districts

Notes
1 Magnus Ramsland died in 1918. In the resulting by-election, he was succeeded by his widow Sarah Ramsland, the first woman ever elected to the Legislative Assembly of Saskatchewan.

October 13, 1917 service vote results
Like other provinces Saskatchewan held a service vote – actually two separate votes – for Saskatchewan residents in the Canadian armed services fighting during World War I. The first vote was for France and Belgium – two members were elected in a block vote; the top member represented France and the second member elected represented Belgium. Another member was also elected to represent troops in Great Britain. Three seats in the Legislature were set aside for these soldier-MLAs.

France and Belgium

Great Britain

See also
List of Saskatchewan political parties
List of Saskatchewan provincial electoral districts

References

Saskatchewan Archives Board – Election Results By Electoral Division
Elections Saskatchewan - Provincial Vote Summaries

Further reading
 

1917 elections in Canada
1917 in Saskatchewan
1917
June 1917 events